The 2007 Saskatchewan general election was held on November 7, 2007 to determine the composition of the 26th Legislative Assembly of Saskatchewan.

The Saskatchewan New Democratic Party government of Premier Lorne Calvert was defeated by the Saskatchewan Party, led by Brad Wall.  It was only the third time in the province's history that a centre-right party had won power.

Campaign

Lorne Calvert, Premier of Saskatchewan and leader of the New Democratic Party (NDP), advised the Lieutenant Governor of Saskatchewan to call an election for November 7, 2007. In the 2003 election, the NDP won 30 of 58 seats to form a majority government. The Saskatchewan Party, then led by Elwin Hermanson, won 28 seats in that election.

Following that election, Hermanson resigned as leader, and Swift Current MLA Brad Wall was acclaimed as his successor in March 2004.

Within a year after Wall took the leadership, the Saskatchewan Party unveiled a much more moderate policy platform in order to expand its support outside its rural base.  This strategy paid off; by the spring of 2007 the Saskatchewan Party was well ahead in most opinion polling.

The NDP promised to create places for 10,000 new post-secondary students, and to lower tuition fees by $1,000. The Saskatchewan Party countered with a promise of a tuition rebate of up to $20,000 after graduation, spread over seven years.

At the leaders' debate, Liberal leader David Karwacki participated alongside Calvert and Wall despite the Liberals holding no seats going into the election. It is the last time to date that the leader of a party other than the NDP or the Saskatchewan Party has been invited to participate.

Results

|- bgcolor=CCCCCC
!rowspan="2" colspan="2" align=left|Party
!rowspan="2" align=left|Party leader
!rowspan="2"|Candidates
!colspan="4" align=center|Seats
!colspan="3" align=center|Popular vote
|- bgcolor=CCCCCC
|align="center"|2003
|align="center"|Dissol.
|align="center"|2007
|align="center"|Change
|align="center"|#
|align="center"|%
|align="center"|% Change

|align=left|Saskatchewan
|align=left|Brad Wall
|align="right"|57
|align="right"|28
|align="right"|28
|align="right"|38
|align="right"|+10
|align="right"|230,671
|align="right"|50.92%
|align="right"|+11.57%

|align=left|New Democratic
|align=left|Lorne Calvert
|align="right"|58
|align="right"|30
|align="right"|30
|align="right"|20
|align="right"|-10
|align="right"|168,704
|align="right"|37.24%
|align="right"|-7.44%

|align=left|Liberal
|align=left|David Karwacki
|align="right"|58
|align="right"|0
|align="right"|0
|align="right"|0
|align="right"|–
|align="right"|42,585
|align="right"|9.40%
|align="right"|-4.78%

|align=left|Sandra Finley
|align="right"|48
|align="right"|0
|align="right"|0
|align="right"|0
|align="right"|–
|align="right"|9,128
|align="right"|2.01%
|align="right"|+1.46%

|align=left|Progressive Conservative
|align=left|Rick Swenson
|align="right"|5
|align="right"|0
|align="right"|0
|align="right"|0
|align="right"|–
|align="right"|832
|align="right"|0.18%
|align="right"|+0.02%

|align=left|John Nesdoly
|align="right"|8
|align="right"|0
|align="right"|0
|align="right"|0
|align="right"|–
|align="right"|572
|align="right"|0.13%
|align="right"|-0.48%

|align=left|Nathan Holowaty
|align="right"|5
|align="right"|0
|align="right"|0
|align="right"|0
|align="right"|–
|align="right"|517
|align="right"|0.11%
|align="right"|+0.11%
|-
|align=left colspan="3"|Total
| align="right"|239
| align="right"|58
| align="right"|58
| align="right"|58
| align="right"|–
| align="right"|453,009
| align="right"|100%
| align="right"| 
|}

Five New Democratic incumbents – Graham Addley, Mark Wartman, Maynard Sonntag, Lon Borgerson and Glenn Hagel – were defeated. Sonntag was initially declared elected in Meadow Lake on election night, but was declared defeated the following day after a reported tabulation error. This result was confirmed following the counting of absentee ballots on November 19.

The other five seat gains for the Saskatchewan Party came in districts where the New Democratic incumbent did not stand for reelection.

This is the most recent election to date in which any party other than the NDP or the Saskatchewan Party received more than 5% of the vote.

Percentages

Ranking

Results by region

10 closest ridings

Moose Jaw North: Warren Michelson (SK Party) def. Glenn Hagel (NDP) by 33 votes
Meadow Lake: Jeremy Harrison (SK Party) def. Maynard Sonntag (NDP) by 36 votes
Prince Albert Carlton: Darryl Hickie (SK Party) def. Chad Nilson (NDP) by 61 votes
Regina Qu'Appelle Valley: Laura Ross (SK Party) def. Mark Wartman (NDP) by 204 votes
Regina South: Bill Hutchinson (SK Party) def. Yens Pedersen (NDP) by 255 votes
Saskatoon Sutherland: Joceline Schriemer (SK Party) def. Graham Addley (NDP) by 269 votes
Saskatoon Meewasin: Frank Quennell (NDP) def. Roger Parent (SK Party) by 299 votes
Saskatoon Greystone: Rob Norris (SK Party) def. Andrew Mason (NDP) by 308 votes
Saskatoon Eastview: Judy Junor (NDP) def. Terry Alm (SK Party) by 310 votes
The Battlefords: Len Taylor (NDP) def. Herb Cox (SK Party) by 312 votes

Riding-by-riding results
People in bold represent cabinet ministers and the Speaker. Party leaders are italicized. The symbol " ** " represents MLAs who did not run again.

Northwest Saskatchewan

Northeast Saskatchewan

West Central Saskatchewan

Southwest Saskatchewan

Southeast Saskatchewan

Saskatoon

Regina

Notes
1 Dan Harder, the Saskatchewan Party candidate in Regina Walsh Acres, withdrew his candidacy on October 27, 2007 after the party learned the details of a complaint of inappropriate conduct made against him by employees of Big Brothers of Regina in 2006 while he was executive director of the organization.

References

Further reading

External links
 2007 Saskatchewan General Election | Mapleleafweb.com
 CBC Digital Archives - Showdown on the Prairies: A History of Saskatchewan Elections

General resources
Government of Saskatchewan 
Elections Saskatchewan
Legislative Assembly of Saskatchewan
Saskatchewan Votes 2007
Saskatchewan Election 2007
Election Almanac - Saskatchewan Provincial Election
Saskatchewan 2007 Provincial Election Forecaster
Official Riding-by-Riding Results - Elections Saskatchewan

Parties
Parties with seats in the previous legislature
Saskatchewan New Democrats
Saskatchewan Party

Parties without seats in the previous legislature
Liberal Party of Saskatchewan
Green Party of Saskatchewan
Progressive Conservative Party of Saskatchewan
Western Independence Party of Saskatchewan
Saskatchewan Marijuana Party
Saskatchewan Democratic Action Party

2007 elections in Canada
2007
2007 in Saskatchewan
November 2007 events in Canada